Imad Rahman is a Pakistani American fiction writer whose first short story collection was published in 2004.

Biography

A native of Karachi, Pakistan who immigrated to the United States at age 18 to attend college, Rahman was an assistant professor of English at Kansas State University, and, as of 2008, is an assistant professor of English at Cleveland State University, where he directs the Imagination Writers Conference. He is a graduate of Ohio Wesleyan University, and holds a Master of Arts from Ohio University and a Master of Fine Arts from the University of Florida. He was the James C. McCreight Fiction Fellow at the Wisconsin Institute for Creative Writing at the University of Wisconsin–Madison in 2001–2002.

The stories in I Dream of Microwaves feature a Pakistani actor who laments that he can't even get work in the U.S. portraying criminals.

Bibliography
Short Story Publications
 2013: 'The Brigadier-General Takes His Final Stand' in xo Orpheus
 2005: "All Roads Lead to Flesh and Bone" in Willow Springs Literary Journal, Issue 55
 2003: "Eating Ohio" in One Story, Issue 19
 2001: "I Dream of Microwaves" in Gulf Coast Literary Journal

Books
 2004: I Dream of Microwaves, short story collection

External links
2004 newspaper interview

Pakistani emigrants to the United States
University of Wisconsin–Madison fellows
Ohio Wesleyan University alumni
Ohio University alumni
Kansas State University faculty
Cleveland State University faculty
University of Florida alumni
American short story writers
Living people
Writers from Karachi
Year of birth missing (living people)